Negley is an unincorporated community and census-designated place in Middleton Township, Columbiana County, Ohio, United States. The population was 274 at the 2020 census.

Historically a mining community, Negley lies at the confluence of Bull Creek and the North Fork of the Little Beaver Creek along State Routes 154 and 170 at the state border with Pennsylvania. It is located on the Youngstown and Southeastern Railroad, and was formerly home to the only Youngstown and Southern Railroad shop.

History

Negley was the site of a Native American community before European colonization, located on a section of the Great Trail that “crossed the pancake” on the way between Pittsburgh, Pennsylvania and Coshocton, Ohio.

Negley derives its name from Civil War Major General James S. Negley, who hailed from Pittsburgh. After the end of the Civil War, Negley returned to Pittsburgh and served in the U.S. House of Representatives for Pennsylvania in the late 19th century. After retiring from politics, he entered the railroad business and became president of the New York, Pittsburgh & Chicago Railway, which in 1883 platted Negley as the first new town along its line, named in his honor. Negley grew in to a small mining community based from a nearby coal mine operated by the Powers Mining Company.

The community formerly had an honor roll for residents who were veterans of World War II on the east side, but it was removed in the 1960s due to deterioration. A Negley post office has been in operation since 1883, which serves eastern Middleton Township and Lake Tomahawk. It bears the ZIP code of 44441.

Geography
The CDP lies along of the North Fork of the Little Beaver Creek and Bull Creek at the foothills of the Appalachian Mountains.

The following highways pass through Negley: 
   State Route 154
   State Route 170

Education
Children in Negley are served by the East Palestine City School District. Negley once had a traditional schoolhouse of its own, and later an elementary school. The current schools serving Negley are:

 East Palestine Elementary School – grades K-4
 East Palestine Middle School – grades 5-8
 East Palestine High School – grades 9-12

Notable people
Ammon Hennacy, Christian anarchist
Kyle Maite, rhythm & lead guitarist for Hit the Lights
Derek Wolfe, NFL defensive end for the Denver Broncos and Baltimore Ravens

References

Census-designated places in Columbiana County, Ohio
1883 establishments in Ohio
Populated places established in 1883